The 2014 ISL Inaugural International Draft is the second draft in the Indian Super League, the new franchise domestic football league in India. The draft featured 49 foreign players who were selected by the eight franchises in the ISL.

The draft took place on 21 August 2014 in Mumbai.

Players available to draft

Source:

Draft Selection

Round 1
The first round saw Pune go first, with them selecting Bruno Cirillo as the first ever foreign player in ISL history.

Round 2

Round 3

Round 4

Round 5

Round 6

Round 7

References

draft
Indian Super League drafts
Draft
Association football player non-biographical articles
ISL Inaugural International Draft
ISL Inaugural International Draft
2010s in Mumbai
Football in Mumbai
Events in Mumbai